The 2005 British Columbia general election was held on May 17, 2005, to elect members of the Legislative Assembly (MLAs) of the Province of British Columbia (BC), Canada. The British Columbia Liberal Party (BC Liberals) formed the government of the province prior to this general election under the leadership of Premier Gordon Campbell.  The main opposition was the British Columbia New Democratic Party (BC NDP), whose electoral representation was reduced to two MLAs in the previous provincial election in 2001.

The BC Liberals retained power, with a reduced majority of 46 out of 79 seats, down from the record 77 out of 79 in 2001. Voter turnout was 58.2 per cent.

Under amendments to the BC Constitution Act passed in 2001, BC elections are now held on fixed dates: the second Tuesday in May every four years. This was the first provincial election for which elector data in the provincial elector list was synchronised with the National Register of Electors.

Coincidental with the general election, BC voters also voted on whether or not to change the province's electoral system. A majority voted for change.

Electoral reform referendum

The BC electoral reform referendum was held in conjunction with this election. This referendum asked voters whether or not they support the proposed electoral reforms of the Citizens' Assembly on Electoral Reform, which included switching to a single transferable vote (STV) system.  Had it been approved by 60% of voters in 60% of ridings), the new electoral system would have been implemented for the general election in 2009.  Although the proposed reform attracted a clear majority (58% of the popular vote in favour, with 77 out of 79 ridings showing majority support), the level of support was just short of that required for mandatory implementation. A new vote on a revamped version of STV was held in conjunction with the 2009 British Columbia general election.

Results by party
Source

* denotes that the party did not contest the election in question

Results by region

xx Denotes party received less than 0.1%

Timeline

Pre-campaign period
 August 30, 2001 - Bill 7, Constitution Amendment Act is passed, fixing the date of the election at May 17, 2005.
 November 13, 2002 - Liberal MLA Paul Nettleton accuses the government of a secret plan to privatize BC Rail as well the BC Hydro electric utility.  He is removed from caucus several days later and sits as an Independent Liberal until the 2005 election, when he unsuccessfully ran in Prince George-Mount Robson against Shirley Bond.  BC Rail was subsequently sold to CN in what other bidders have described as a corrupted process, and BC Hydro's administrative arm was sold to Accenture.
January 9, 2003 - Premier Gordon Campbell is arrested for driving under the influence of alcohol on Maui.  Because drunk driving is not a criminal offence in the state of Hawaii, but only a misdemeanour, Campbell did not resign his seat as he would have had to in Canada, and due to pressure from Mothers Against Drunk Driving (MADD) he attended Alcoholics Anonymous meetings and a series of speaking engagements condemning drinking and driving.
 November 23, 2003 - Carole James is elected as leader of the New Democratic Party of British Columbia.
 December 28, 2003 - the RCMP execute search warrants on various locations in the Lower Mainland and Greater Victoria, including offices in the Parliament Buildings in Victoria, in relation to suspicious dealings in relation to the bidding process for the sale of BC Rail (see BC Legislature Raids).
 March 22, 2004 - Liberal MLA Elayne Brenzinger quits the caucus citing a "secret agenda" being undertaken by Premier Campbell in relation to the sale of BC Rail.
 September 17, 2004 - Deputy Premier Christy Clark, whose house had been searched under warrant by the RCMP in connection with the BC Legislature Raids investigation, quits politics saying she wanted to spend more time with her family.
 October 22, 2004 - New Democrat Jagrup Brar wins a by-election in Surrey-Panorama Ridge with 53.6% of the vote, a swing of 33.7% to the NDP from the 2001 result.  One of Brar's competitors was Green leader Adriane Carr who captured 8.4% of the vote.
 December 14, 2004 - In the wake of revelations he had been under surveillance by the RCMP in connection with dealings concerning the sale of BC Rail, Liberal Finance Minister Gary Farrell-Collins abruptly resigns from cabinet and the legislature despite having been named co-chair of the Liberal re-election campaign a month earlier.  The move requires Premier Campbell to undertake a minor cabinet shuffle.
 January 15, 2005 - The Democratic Reform British Columbia party is created out of a merger of the British Columbia Democratic Coalition and the All Nations Party of British Columbia.  The party also boasts the support of key elements of the Reform Party of British Columbia.  Prior to the official creation of this party, the Democratic Coalition and Reform BC jointly nominated a candidate for the Surrey-Panorama Ridge by-election.
 January 19, 2005 - Independent MLA Elayne Brenzinger joins DRBC, adding a third party to the Legislative Assembly for the first time since Gordon Wilson folded his Progressive Democratic Alliance party and joined the NDP.
 January 31, 2005 - Liberal MLA and then-cabinet minister Sandy Santori resigns from his seat in the Legislature in a dispute over the deletion of emails by Premier Gordon Campbell's Deputy Minister to the Premier, Ken Dobell.<ref>[http://bctrialofbasi-virk.blogspot.com/2009/06/delete-button-wipes-out-transparency-in.html#links Delete button wipes out 'transparency' in government: Called for 'thorough, complete, diligent investigation', Michael Smyth, The Province June 25, 2009, quoted in the BC Legislature Raids blog]</ref>
 February 15, 2005 - New Liberal Finance Minister Colin Hansen introduces what is widely viewed as an "election budget" which promised $1.3 billion in new spending, tax cuts and an economic surplus.
 March 11, 2005 - Attorney-General Geoff Plant announces that he will not seek re-election.
 March 15, 2005 - Canadian Broadcasting Corporation board chair Carole Taylor announces that she will run for the Liberals in the riding of Vancouver-Langara. Premier Gordon Campbell endorses Taylor's candidacy.
 March 29, 2005 - The consortium of television stations organizing the leaders' debate announces that the leaders of the Liberal, New Democratic, and Green parties will be invited to participate in the debate.
 April 13, 2005 - The NDP and Green Party release their platforms in Victoria.

Campaign period
April 19, 2005 - The writ of election is issued (not "dropped" as in past elections), dissolving the Legislature and beginning the official campaign period.
April 20, 2005 - The NDP becomes the first party to complete a province-wide nomination slate.
April 22, 2005 - NDP candidate Rollie Keith withdraws his candidacy in Chilliwack-Kent after telling the Vancouver Province that he was "impressed" when he met Slobodan Milošević and that he did not believe there had been war crimes committed in Kosovo.
May 3, 2005 - The leaders of the Liberal, NDP and Green parties meet in a televised debate.  Commentators indicate the debate was either a draw or a win for Green leader Adriane Carr.  An Ipsos-Reid poll conducted online following the debate showed that 33% of debate views thought the debate produced no clear winner, 31% felt NDP leader Carole James won, 23% felt Liberal leader Gordon Campbell won while only 12% saw Carr as the winner.
May 17, 2005 - CBC projects a BC Liberal majority government at 9:05 p.m. local time.
June 22, 2005 - Tim Stevenson, who lost to Lorne Mayencourt by 11 votes, asks the Supreme Court of British Columbia to order a new election in Vancouver-Burrard due to 70 ballots that could not be counted because they had not been initialed by election officials.

Opinion polls
Voter intention polling

Besides the usual public polling by market research firms, other organizations have been attempting to predict the results of the upcoming election using alternate methods.  Results suggest that all three projections below underestimated NDP seats and overestimated Liberal seats:

UBC's Election Stock Market tracks the prices of contracts whose value depend on election results: 
Popular vote: Lib 44.5%, NDP 35.9%, Green 13.9%, Other 5.3%
Seats: Lib 48.6 (61.5), NDP 29.4 (37.2), Other 1.6 (2.0)(values in parentheses are values of actual contracts, in cents)

The Election Prediction Project aggregates submissions from the Internet and subjectively predicts winners based on the submissions (see methodology):
Seats: Lib 50, NDP 29, Other 0

Will McMartin at the progressive online newspaper The Tyee makes his predictions by looking at "historic election results and selected demographics, as well as public opinion polls, regional sources and input from Election Central readers" (see details):
Seats: Lib 51, NDP 28, Other 0.

Political parties
British Columbia has Canada's least restrictive elections laws with regard to political party registration, and consequently there are currently nearly 50 parties registered with Elections BC, by far the most of any jurisdiction in the country.  Twenty-five parties contested the 2005 election, also a considerably greater number than anywhere else in Canada.

British Columbia Liberal Party

New Democratic Party of British Columbia

Green Party of British Columbia

Democratic Reform British Columbia

British Columbia Marijuana Party

Minor parties

Candidates
The deadline for candidate registration was Wednesday, May 4, 2005, at 1:00 p.m. Pacific Time.

Names in bold indicate party leaders and cabinet ministers.
The victorious Member of the Legislative Assembly (MLA) for each district has a coloured bar to the left of his or her name.
Incumbents who did not seek re-election are denoted by †

Northern British Columbia

|-
|bgcolor=whitesmoke|Bulkley Valley-Stikine
||
|Dennis MacKay  6729
|
|Doug Donaldson  5177
|
|Leanna Mitchell  769
|
|Nipper Kettle  354
|
|Reginald Gunanoot  205
|
|Jack Kortmeyer (BCP)175Frank Martin (PF)41
||
|Dennis MacKay
|-
|bgcolor=whitesmoke|North Coast
|
|Bill Belsey  4185
||
|Gary Coons  5845
|
|Hondo Arendt  629
|
| 
|
|Dave Johns  211
|
| 
||
|Bill Belsey
|-
|bgcolor=whitesmoke|Peace River North
||
|Richard Neufeld  5498
|
|Brian Churchill  2511
|
|Clarence Apsassin  638
|
| 
|
| 
|
|Leonard Joseph Seigo (Ind.)  613
||
|Richard Neufeld
|-
|bgcolor=whitesmoke|Peace River South
||
|Blair Lekstrom  5810
|
|Pat Shaw  3296
|
|Ariel Lade  956
|
| 
|
| 
|
| 
||
|Blair Lekstrom
|-
|bgcolor=whitesmoke|Prince George-Mount Robson
||
|Shirley Bond  5885
|
|Wayne Mills  4994
|
|Don Roberts  1053
|
| 
|
|Matt Burnett  241
|
|Paul Nettleton (Ind.)  2158
||
|Shirley Bond
|-
|bgcolor=whitesmoke|Prince George North
||
|Pat Bell  7697
|
|Deborah Poff  5598
|
|Denis Gendron  1201
|
|Mike Mann  241
|
|Steve Wolfe  235
|
|Leif Jensen(Ind.)  443
||
|Pat Bell
|-
|bgcolor=whitesmoke|Prince George-Omineca
||
|John Rustad  8622
|
|Chuck Fraser  6184
|
|Andrej DeWolf  1393
|
|Erle Martz  479
|
| 
|
|
|| 
|Paul Nettleton
|-
|bgcolor=whitesmoke|Skeena
|
|Roger Harris  5807
||
|Robin Austin  6166
|
|Patrick Hayes  616
|
| 
|
| 
|
|Daniel Stelmacker (Unity)  224
||
|Roger Harris
|-

Kootenay, Columbia and Boundary

|-
|bgcolor=whitesmoke|Columbia River-Revelstoke
|
|Wendy McMahon  5750
||
|Norm Macdonald  7460
|
|Andy Shadrack  1217
|
| 
|
| 
|
| 
||
|Wendy McMahon
|-
|bgcolor=whitesmoke|East Kootenay
||
|Bill Bennett  8060
|
|Erda Walsh  7339
|
|Luke Gurbin  1389
|
| 
|
| 
|
| 
||
|Bill Bennett
|-
|bgcolor=whitesmoke|Nelson-Creston
|
|Blair Suffredine5862
||
|Corky Evans12896
|
|Luke Crawford2724
|
| 
|
|Phillip McMillan276
|
|Brian Taylor (Bloc BC)173
||
|Blair Suffredine
|-
|bgcolor=whitesmoke|West Kootenay-Boundary
|
|Pam Lewin  6180
||
|Katrine Conroy  13318
|
|Donald Pharand  1561
|
| 
|
| 
|
|Barry Chilton (Con) 802  Glen Millar (Not Affil) 180  A.J. van Leur(Bloc BC)  59
||
|align=center|vacant|-

Okanagan and Shuswap

|-
|bgcolor=whitesmoke|Kelowna-Lake Country
||
|Al Horning  12247
|
|John Pugsley  7390
|
|Kevin Ade  2541
|
|Alan Clarke  1793
|
|David Thomson  341
|
| 
||
|John Weisbeck†
|-
|bgcolor=whitesmoke|Kelowna-Mission
||
|Sindi Hawkins  13827
|
|Nicki Hokazono  8189
|
|Paddy Weston  3308
|
| 
|
|Shilo Lavallee  320
|
|Steve Roebuck (Comm.)  94
||
|Sindi Hawkins
|-
|bgcolor=whitesmoke|Okanagan-Vernon
||
|Tom Christensen  11566
|
|Juliette Cunningham  8995
|
|Erin Nelson  1867
|
| 
|
|Michael Toponce  260
|
|Colin Black (Con.)3095Gordon Campbell (Not Affil)945Tibor Tusnady (Patr.)48
||
|Tom Christensen
|-
|bgcolor=whitesmoke|Okanagan-Westside
||
|Rick Thorpe  12148
|
|Joyce Procure  6873
|
|Angela Reid  2262
|
|Janice Money  1051
|
| 
|
| 
||
|Rick Thorpe
|-
|bgcolor=whitesmoke|Penticton-Okanagan Valley
||
|Bill Barisoff  13650
|
|Garry Litke  10197
|
|James Cunningham  2669
|
| 
|
| 
|
|Jane Turnell(Ind.)  660
||
|Bill Barisoff
|-
|bgcolor=whitesmoke|Shuswap
||
|George Abbott  11024
|
|Calvin White  8281
|
|Barbara Westerman  1394
|
| 
|
|Chris Emery  356
|
|Beryl Ludwig(Con.)2330Paddy Roberts(Bloc BC)50Andrew Hockhold(Patr.)42
||
|George Abbott
|-

Thompson and Cariboo

|-
|bgcolor=whitesmoke|Cariboo North
|
|Steve Wallace  7084
||
|Bob Simpson  7353
|
|Douglas Gook  835
|
| 
|
|James Michael Delbarre  281
|
| 
||
|John Wilson†
|-
|bgcolor=whitesmoke|Cariboo South
|
|Walt Cobb  7163
||
|Charlie Wyse  7277
|
|Ed Sharkey  851
|
| 
|
| 
|
|Michael Orr(Ind.)  532
||
|Walt Cobb
|-
|bgcolor=whitesmoke|Kamloops
||
|Claude Richmond  11261
|
|Doug Brown  9886
|
|Frank Stewart  1723
|
| 
|
| 
|
|Terry Bojarski (Con.)  797
||
|Claude Richmond
|-
|bgcolor=whitesmoke|Kamloops-North Thompson
||
|Kevin Krueger  11648
|
|Mike Hanson  9635
|
|Grant Fraser  1689
|
| 
|
|Keenan Todd  321
|
|Bob Altenhofen (Con.)  795
||
|Kevin Krueger
|-
|bgcolor=whitesmoke|Yale-Lillooet
|
|Lloyd Forman  7009
||
|Harry Lali  8489
|
|Mike McLean  1583
|
|Arne Zabel  185
|
| 
|
|Dorothy-Jean O'Donnell (PF)115
||
|Dave Chutter†
|-

Fraser Valley

|-
|bgcolor=whitesmoke|Abbotsford-Clayburn
||
|John van Dongen  11047
|
|Michael Nenn  5555
|
|Lance Pizzariello  1428
|
| 
|
|Ian Gilfilian  198
|
|Kenneth Montgomery Keillor (FP)  199
||
|John van Dongen
|-
|bgcolor=whitesmoke|Abbotsford-Mount Lehman
||
|Mike de Jong  11325
|
|Taranjit Purewal  6132
|
|Jed Anderson  1359
|
|Bob Klassen  472
|
|Tim Felger  392
|
| 
||
|Mike de Jong
|-
|bgcolor=whitesmoke|Chilliwack-Kent
||
|Barry Penner  11368
|
|Malcolm James  6534
|
|Hans Mulder  1651
|
| 
|
| 
|
|David Anderson (Mod.)  240 Colin Wormworth (BCYC)  103
||
|Barry Penner
|-
|bgcolor=whitesmoke|Chilliwack-Sumas
||
|John Les  11995
|
|John-Henry Harter  6477
|
|Norm Siefken  1731
|
|Brian Downey  315
|
|
|
|Augustine Lee (BCYC)  266James Solhiem (Mod.)  127
||
|John Les
|-
|bgcolor=whitesmoke|Fort Langley-Aldergrove
||
|Rich Coleman  15454
|
|Shane Dyson  7597
|
|Andrea Welling  2529
|
| 
|
|Marc Emery  374
|
|Stephen Davis (Plat.)  183
||
|Rich Coleman
|-
|bgcolor=whitesmoke|Langley
||
|Mary Polak  12877
|
|Dean Morrison  8303
|
|Kathleen Stephany  3042
|
| 
|
|Chris Scrimes  278
|
|Lee Davies (Plat.)180
||
|Lynn Stephens
|-
|bgcolor=whitesmoke|Maple Ridge-Mission
||
|Randy Hawes  12095
|
|Jenny Stevens  11896
|
|Bill Walsh  2633
|
| 
|
|Carol Gwilt  314
|
|Chum Richardson (Ind.) 312  Keith Smith (Plat.)  53
||
|Randy Hawes
|-
|bgcolor=whitesmoke|Maple Ridge-Pitt Meadows
|
|Ken Stewart  10861
||
|Michael Sather  11786
|
|Mike Gildersleeve  1869
|
|Rick Butler  534
|
|Denise-Colleen Briere-Smart  360
|
| 
||
|Ken Stewart
|-

Surrey

|-
|bgcolor=whitesmoke|Surrey-Cloverdale
||
|Kevin Falcon  16429
|
|Ted Allen  7640
|
|Pierre Rovtar  2280
|
|Joseph Vollhoffer  305
|
| 
|
| 
||
|Kevin Falcon
|-
|bgcolor=whitesmoke|Surrey-Green Timbers
|
|Brenda Locke  5619
||
|Sue Hammell  10836
|
|Sebastian Sajda  791
|
|Ravi Chand  142
|
|Amanda Boggan  225
|
|Rob Norberg (ED)151Harjit Singh Daudharia (Comm.)  52
||
|Brenda Locke
|-
|bgcolor=whitesmoke|Surrey-Newton
|
|Daniel Igali  6473
||
|Harry Bains  10741
|
|Dan Deresh  876
|
|Harry Grewal  268
|
| 
|
|Gordon Scott (WLP)  123  Jeff Robert Evans (Plat.)  72
||
|Tony Bhullar†
|-
|bgcolor=whitesmoke|Surrey-Panorama Ridge
|
|Bob Hans  8573
||
|Jagrup Brar  11553
|
|Romeo De La Pena  1370
|
| 
|
|Troy Chan  234
|
| 
||
|Jagrup Brar
|-
|bgcolor=whitesmoke|Surrey-Tynehead
||
|Dave Hayer  12052
|
|Barry Bell  9469
|
|Sean Orr  1095
|
|
|
|Don Briere  243
|
|Summer Davis (Ind.) 380  Gary Hoffman (Ind.)  223
||
|Dave Hayer
|-
|bgcolor=whitesmoke|Surrey-Whalley
|
|Barb Steele  4949
||
|Bruce Ralston  8903
|
|Roy Whyte  1238
|
|Elayne Brenzinger  607
|
|Neal Magnuson  302
|
|Joe Pal (Not Affil)  139  Melady Belinda Earl (Plat.)  50
||
|Elayne Brenzinger
|-
|bgcolor=whitesmoke|Surrey-White Rock
||
|Gordon Hogg  16462
|
|Moh Chelali  7511
|
|Ashley Hughes  3051
|
|Ron Dunsford  87
|
| 
|
|David James Evans (Con.)1340
||
|Gordon Hogg
|-

Richmond and Delta

|-
|bgcolor=whitesmoke|Delta North
|
|Jeannie Kanakos  9480
||
|Guy Gentner  10481
|
|John Hague  1711
|
| 
|
|John Shavluk  224
|
|David Andrew Wright (BCP)  187
||
|Reni Masi†
|-
|bgcolor=whitesmoke|Delta South
||
|Val Roddick  9112
|
|Dileep Athaide  5828
|
|Duane Laird  1131
|
| 
|
|Julian Wooldridge  139
|
|Vicki Huntington (Ind.)8043 George Mann (Not Affil)  58
||
|Val Roddick
|-
|bgcolor=whitesmoke|Richmond Centre
||
|Olga Ilich  10908
|
|Dale Jackaman  6051
|
|Chris Segers  1436
|
| 
|
|Matt Healy  231
|
| 
||
|Greg Halsey-Brandt†
|-
|bgcolor=whitesmoke|Richmond East
||
|Linda Reid  11652
|
|Gian Sihota  6692
|
|Michael Wolfe  1530
|
| 
|
|Heidi Farnola  191
|
|Mohamud  Ali Farah (Ind.)  207
||
|Linda Reid
|-
|bgcolor=whitesmoke|Richmond-Steveston
||
|John Yap  13859
|
|Kay Hale  7334
|
|Egidio Spinelli  1934
|
|Daniel Ferguson  282
|
| 
|
| 
||
|Geoff Plant†
|-

Vancouver's eastern suburbs

|-
|bgcolor=whitesmoke|Burnaby-Edmonds
|
|Patty Sahota  9599
||
|Raj Chouhan  10337
|
|Suzanne Deveau  2192
|
| 
|
| 
|
| 
||
|Patty Sahota
|-
|bgcolor=whitesmoke|Burnaby North
||
|Richard T. Lee  10421
|
|Pietro Calendino  10356
|
|Richard Brand  1763
|
|Matthew Laird 316
|
| 
|
| 
||
|Richard T. Lee
|-
|bgcolor=whitesmoke|Burnaby-Willingdon
||
|John Nuraney  8754
|
|Gabriel Yiu  8355
|
|Pauline Farrell  1482
|
|Tony Kuo  947
|
|John Warrens  214
|
|Tom Tao (Ind.)  142
||
|John Nuraney
|-
|bgcolor=whitesmoke|Burquitlam
||
|Harry Bloy  10054
|
|Bart Healey  9682
|
|Carli Travers  1619
|
| 
|
|Peter Grin  191
|
|Graham Fox (Not Affil)  125
||
|Harry Bloy
|-
|bgcolor=whitesmoke|Coquitlam-Maillardville
|
|Richard Stewart10001
||
|Diane Thorne  10532
|
|Michael Hejazi 1415
|
| 
|
|Brandon Steele236
|
|Paul Geddes(Lbt.)173Nattanya Andersen(Plat.)69
||
|Richard Stewart
|-
|bgcolor=whitesmoke|New Westminster
|
|Joyce Murray  9645
||
|Chuck Puchmayr  13226
|
|Robert Broughton  2416
|
|John Warren  152
|
|Christina Racki  293
|
|Greg Calcutta (Plat.)  42
||
|Joyce Murray
|-
|bgcolor=whitesmoke|Port Coquitlam-Burke Mountain
|
|Greg Moore  10752
||
|Mike Farnworth  11844
|
|Bill Aaroe  1691
|
| 
|
| 
|
|Anthony Yao(SC)228Lewis Dahlby (Lbt.)90
||
|Karn Manhas†
|-
|bgcolor=whitesmoke|Port Moody-Westwood
||
|Iain Black  14161
|
|Karen Rockwell  9848
|
|Kathy Heisler  1670
|
| 
|
| 
|
|James Filippelli (YPP)442Arthur Crossman (Ind.)227
||
|Christy Clark†
|-

Vancouver

|-
|bgcolor=whitesmoke|Vancouver-Burrard
||
|Lorne Mayencourt  12009
|
|Tim Stevenson  11998
|
|Janek Kuchmistrz  3698
|
|Ian McLeod  82
|
| 
|
|John Clarke (Lbt.)388Lisa Voldeng (WLP)170 John Ince (Sex)111Antonio Ferreira (Plat.)27
||
|Lorne Mayencourt
|-
|bgcolor=whitesmoke|Vancouver-Fairview
|
|Virginia Greene  12114
||
|Gregor Robertson  13009
|
|Hamdy El-Rayes  2479
|
| 
|
| 
|
|Patrick Clark (Sex)121 Scott Yee (Ind.)102Malcolm Janet Mary van Delst (WLP)95
||
|align="center"|vacant''
|-
|bgcolor=whitesmoke|Vancouver-Fraserview
||
|Wally Oppal  9895
|
|Ravinder Gill  8783
|
|Doug Perry  1374
|
| 
|
|Shea Campbell  650
|
| 
||
|Ken Johnston†
|-
|bgcolor=whitesmoke|Vancouver-Hastings
|
|Laura McDiarmid  6910
||
|Shane Simpson  11726
|
|Ian Gregson  1928
|
| 
|
|Stephen Payne  188
|
|Carrol Woolsey (SC)274Dennise Brennan (WLP)247Will Offley (Ind.)130Catherine Millard Saadi (Plat.)68
||
|Joy MacPhail†
|-
|bgcolor=whitesmoke|Vancouver-Kensington
|
|Patrick Wong  8949
||
|David Chudnovsky  10573
|
|Cody Matheson  1273
|
| 
|
|John Gordon  266
|
|Charles Boylan (PF)  99
||
|Patrick Wong
|-
|bgcolor=whitesmoke|Vancouver-Kingsway
|
|Rob Nijjar  7894
||
|Adrian Dix  10038
|
|Stuart MacKinnon  1212
|
| 
|
|Steven Lay  219
|
|Donna Petersen(PF)77Yvonne Tink (Sex)73
||
|Rob Nijjar
|-
|bgcolor=whitesmoke|Vancouver-Langara
||
|Carole Taylor  11181
|
|Anita Romaniuk  6520
|
|Doug Warkentin  1591
|
| 
|
|Mark Gueffroy  144
|
|Christopher De Wilde (Libert.)184Charlie Brunet-Latimer (WLP)152
||
|Val Anderson†
|-
|bgcolor=whitesmoke|Vancouver-Mount Pleasant
|
|Juliet Andalis  4298
||
|Jenny Kwan  12974
|
|Raven Bowen  2066
|
|Imtiaz Popat  43
|
|Chris Bennett  308
|
|Mike Hansen (Ind.) 205Niki Westman (WLP)187Peter Marcus (Comm.)98  Kirk Anton Moses (Plat.)17
||
|Jenny Kwan
|-
|bgcolor=whitesmoke|Vancouver-Point Grey
||
|Gordon Campbell  12498
|
|Mel Lehan  10248
|
|Damian Kettlewell  4111
|
| 
|
|Yolanda Perez  138
|
|Tom Walker (WLP)126Jeff Monds (Libert.)44Gudrun Kost (Plat.)18
||
|Gordon Campbell
|-
|bgcolor=whitesmoke|Vancouver-Quilchena
||
|Colin Hansen  16394
|
|Jarrah Hodge  5131
|
|Lorinda Earl  2538
|
| 
|
|Rhiannon Rose  175
|
|Katrina Chowne (Libert.)174
||
|Colin Hansen
|-

North Shore and Sunshine Coast

|-
|bgcolor=whitesmoke|North Vancouver-Lonsdale
||
|Katherine Whittred9375
|
|Craig Keating8391
|
|Terry Long2562
|
|Matt Wadsworth163
|
|Rebecca Ambrose209
|
|Ron Gamble (Ref.)365
||
|Katherine Whittred
|-
|bgcolor=whitesmoke|North Vancouver-Seymour
||
|Daniel Jarvis  14518
|
|Cathy Pinsent  7595
|
|John Sharpe  3013
|
| 
|
|Darin Neal  212
|
|Christine Ellis(WLP)  169
||
|Daniel Jarvis
|-
|bgcolor=whitesmoke|Powell River-Sunshine Coast
|
|Maureen Clayton  7702
||
|Nicholas Simons  11099
|
|Adriane Carr  6585
|
| 
|
| 
|
|Allen McIntyre (RefedBC)  156
||
|Harold Long†
|-
|bgcolor=whitesmoke|West Vancouver-Capilano
||
|Ralph Sultan  14665
|
|Terry Platt  3900
|
|Lee White  2648
|
| 
|
|Jodie Giesz-Ramsay  147
|
|Ben West (WLP)  122
||
|Ralph Sultan
|-
|bgcolor=whitesmoke|West Vancouver-Garibaldi
||
|Joan McIntyre  11808
|
|Lyle Fenton  4947
|
|Dennis Perry  6235
|
| 
|
| 
|
|Barbara Ann Reid (Cons.)  464
||
|Ted Nebbeling†
|-

Vancouver Island

|-
|bgcolor=whitesmoke|Alberni-Qualicum
|   
|Gillian Trumper    9788
||
|Scott Fraser    13988
|   
|Jack Thornburgh   1912
|   
|Jennifer Fisher-Bradley   292
|
|Michael Mann  401
|   
|James Dominic King (Ind.)  209
||   
|Gillian Trumper   
|-   
|bgcolor=whitesmoke|Comox Valley
||  
|Stan Hagen  14068  
|
|Andrew Black    13261
|   
|Chris Aikman    2833
|   
|Don Davis  187
|
|Miracle Emery    214
|   
|Bruce O'Hara (WLP)83Mel Garden (RefedBC)67Barbara Biley (PF)  51
||   
|Stan Hagen   
|-   
|bgcolor=whitesmoke|Cowichan-Ladysmith   
|   
|Graham Bruce    11425
||
|Doug Routley     14014
|   
|Cindy-Lee Robinson  1950
|   
|Brian Johnson  238
|
|    
|   
|Jim Bell (Ind.)  307 Jeremy Harold Smyth (FP)     83 
||   
|Graham Bruce   
|-   
|bgcolor=whitesmoke|Nanaimo   
|   
|Mike Hunter  8657
||
|Leonard Krog    13226
|   
|Doug Catley    2933
|   
| 
|
|Matt Dillon    294
|   
|Brunie Brunie (Ind.)    204Linden Shaw (RefedBC)169
||   
|Mike Hunter   
|-   
|bgcolor=whitesmoke|Nanaimo-Parksville   
||
|Ron Cantelon    16542
|   
|Carol McNamee  12432
|   
|Jordan Ellis   2714
|   
|  
|
|Richard Payne  198 
|   
|Bruce Ryder (RefedBC)  283
||   
|Judith Reid†   
|-   
|bgcolor=whitesmoke|North Island   
|   
|Rod Visser    10804
||
|Claire Trevena    11464
|   
|Phillip Stone    1874
|   
|Dan Cooper  699
|
|    
|   
|Lorne James Scott (Ind.)  471   
||   
|Rod Visser
|-

Greater Victoria
   
|-   
|bgcolor=whitesmoke|Esquimalt-Metchosin   
|   
|Tom Woods    9650
||
|Maurine Karagianis  12545
|   
|Jane Sterk    2672
|   
|Graeme Rodger  409
|
|    
|   
|    
||   
|Arnie Hamilton†   
|-   
|bgcolor=whitesmoke|Malahat-Juan de Fuca   
|   
|Cathy Basskin  10528  
||
|John Horgan    12460
|   
|Steven Hurdle   2610
|   
|Tom Morino  1256
|
|   
|   
|Pattie O'Brien (WCC)  180
||   
|Brian Kerr†   
|-   
|bgcolor=whitesmoke|Oak Bay-Gordon Head   
||   
|Ida Chong    13443
|   
|Charley Beresford  12016
|   
|Stephen Hender    2379
|   
|Lyne England  278  
|
| 
|   
|Lindsay Budge (Ind.)  176
||   
|Ida Chong   
|-   
|bgcolor=whitesmoke|Saanich North and the Islands   
||   
|Murray Coell    13781
|   
|Christine Hunt    11842
|   
|Ken Rouleau    4846
|   
|Ian Bruce 1092
|
|    
|   
|    
||   
|Murray Coell   
|-   
|bgcolor=whitesmoke|Saanich South   
|   
|Susan Brice  12380
||
|David Cubberley    12809
|   
|Brandon McIntyre  2018
|   
|Brett Hinch  223
|
|    
|   
|Douglas Christie (WCC) 207  Kerry Steinemann (Ind.)  161
||   
|Susan Brice   
|-   
|bgcolor=whitesmoke|Victoria-Beacon Hill   
|   
|Jeff Bray    8621
||
|Carole James  16081
|   
|John Miller    3077
|   
|David McCaig  169
|
|    
|   
|Benjamin McConchie (Ind.)    124  Ingmar Lee (Ind.)  123
||   
|Jeff Bray   
|-   
|bgcolor=whitesmoke|Victoria-Hillside   
|   
|Sheila Orr   7028
||
|Rob Fleming    13911
|   
|Steve Filipovic    2933
|   
|Jim McDermott  360
|
|    
|   
|Katrina Herriot (WLP)   168
||   
|Sheila Orr
|-

References

Further reading

External links
 Elections BC
 Elections BC - Statement of Votes - 38th Provincial General Election
Elections BC - Errata to Statutory Reports of the May 17, 2005
 CBC - BC Votes 2005
 canada.com/The Vancouver Sun - BC Election 2005
 The Tyee Election Central: Battleground BC
 Election Almanac - British Columbia Provincial Election
 Simulation of 2005 Election with STV Ridings
 electionprediction.org - BC 2005
 UBC Election Stock Market B.C. 2005
 Prof. Antweiler's "Voter Migration Matrix" Election Forecasting Tool
 2001 Election Candidate Financial Disclosures

2005
2005 elections in Canada
2005 in British Columbia
May 2005 events in Canada